Georgia's 1st congressional district is a congressional district in the U.S. state of Georgia. It is currently represented by Republican Buddy Carter, though the district's boundaries were redrawn following the 2010 United States Census, which granted an additional congressional seat to Georgia. The first election using the new district boundaries were the 2012 congressional elections.

The district comprises the entire coastal area of Sea Islands and much of the southeastern part of the state. In addition to Savannah, the district includes the cities of Brunswick, Jesup, and Waycross.

There are four military bases in the district:
Kings Bay Naval Submarine Base, at Kings Bay in Camden County
Fort Stewart, near Hinesville in Liberty County
Hunter Army Airfield in Savannah
Moody Air Force Base near Valdosta

Counties
 Appling County
 Bacon County
 Brantley County
 Bryan County
 Camden County
 Charlton County
 Chatham County
 Effingham County (Partial, see also )
 Glynn County
 Liberty County
 Long County
 McIntosh County
 Pierce County
 Ware County
 Wayne County

Recent results in statewide elections

List of members representing the district

Recent election results

2002

2004

2006

2008

2010

2012

2014

2016

2018

2020

2022

See also
Georgia's congressional districts
List of United States congressional districts

References

 Congressional Biographical Directory of the United States 1774–present

External links
 PDF map of Georgia's 1st district at nationalatlas.gov
 Georgia's 1st district at GovTrack.us

01